Nitel Joint-Stock Company is a company based in Nizhniy Novgorod, Russia.

NITEL is among the world's leading producers of VHF air surveillance and surface-to-air missile target acquisition radars; its radars have counter-stealth features. Also a major manufacturer of television receivers, NITEL produces about 300,000 sets annually, 90 percent of which are color TVs. In the early 1990s, NITEL's civil production reportedly constituted 70 percent of its total output.

References

External links
 Official website

Electronics companies of Russia
Russian brands
Manufacturing companies based in Nizhniy Novgorod
Radar manufacturers
Ministry of Radio Industry (Soviet Union)
Electronics companies of the Soviet Union
Defence companies of the Soviet Union